The 2010 Nebraska gubernatorial election was held on Tuesday, November 2, 2010 to elect the governor of Nebraska, who would serve a four-year term that began in January 2011. Republican incumbent Dave Heineman won, defeating Democrat Mike Meister in a landslide. Heineman easily won his party's nomination. Mark Lakers ran unopposed in the Democratic primary, but dropped out in July 2010. Attorney Mike Meister was chosen as a replacement. , this was the last time Lancaster County voted for the Republican candidate.

Republican primary

Candidates
Paul Anderson
Christopher Geary, retired Marine
Dave Heineman, incumbent Governor of Nebraska

Results

Democratic primary

Candidates
 Mark Lakers, investment banker

Results

Lakers was unopposed for the Democratic nomination.  However, he dropped out of the race on July 2, 2010, due to a scandal involving campaign fundraising.  Several donors listed on a campaign finance report denied ever giving money to Lakers, prompting criticism from both parties.

After being forced from the race due to investigations by the Nebraska Attorney General's Office and the Nebraska Campaign Disclosure Board, Lakers pleaded guilty in September to a misdemeanor charge of abuse of public records and admitted to falsifying his campaign finance reports. As part of the plea, Lakers acknowledged that 51 of the 80 pledges listed on his reports were false and agreed to pay a $500 fine.

Mike Meister, the Democratic nominee for Attorney General of Nebraska in 2002, was selected to replace him and he selected Nebraska Public Service Commissioner and former state Democratic Party chairwoman Anne Boyle as his running mate.

General election

Predictions

Polling

Results

See also
 2010 Nebraska elections
 2010 United States gubernatorial elections

References

External links
Elections at Nebraska Secretary of State
Nebraska Governor Candidates at Project Vote Smart
Campaign contributions for 2010 Nebraska Governor from Follow the Money
Nebraska Governor 2010 from OurCampaigns.com
2010 Nebraska General Election graph of multiple polls from Pollster.com
Election 2010: Nebraska Governor from Rasmussen Reports

2010 Nebraska Governor's Race from CQ Politics
Race Profile in The New York Times
Official campaign sites (Archived)
Dave Heineman for Re-election
Mike Meister for Governor

Gubernatorial
2010
2010 United States gubernatorial elections